Cecil may refer to:

People with the name
 Cecil (given name), a given name (including a list of people and fictional characters with the name)
 Cecil (surname), a surname (including a list of people with the name)

Places

Canada
Cecil, Alberta, Canada

United States
Cecil, Alabama
Cecil, Georgia
Cecil, Ohio
Cecil, Oregon
Cecil, Pennsylvania
Cecil, West Virginia
Cecil, Wisconsin
Cecil Airport, in Jacksonville, Florida
Cecil County, Maryland

Computing and technology
Cecil (programming language), prototype-based programming language
Computer Supported Learning, a learning management system by the University of Auckland, New Zealand

Music
Cecil (British band), a band from Liverpool, active 1993-2000
Cecil (Japanese band), a band from Kajigaya, Japan, active 2000-2006

Other uses
Cecil (lion), a famed lion killed in Zimbabwe in 2015
Cecil (Passions), a minor character from the NBC soap opera Passions
Cecil (soil), the dominant red clay soil in the American South
Cecil College, a community college
The Cecil, a heritage hotel in Shimla, India, built in 1884
Long Cecil, a gun
Cecil, a Danish cigarette brand by House of Prince
Caecilius of Elvira, patron saint of Granada

See also
 Cecil Hotel (disambiguation)
CeCILL, a French free software license